Blue Knob is an unincorporated community and census-designated place (CDP) in Blair County, Pennsylvania, United States. It was first listed as a CDP prior to the 2020 census.

The CDP is in southwestern Blair County, at the southern end of Juniata Township. Pennsylvania Route 164 passes through the community, leading east down the Front  to East Freedom and west  to Portage. Knob Road leads south from the CDP  to Blue Knob State Park, atop Blue Knob, the second-highest peak in Pennsylvania.

Demographics

References 

Census-designated places in Blair County, Pennsylvania
Census-designated places in Pennsylvania